Caroline Claire (born February 2, 2000) is an American slopestyle skier. She was a member of the United States national team for the 2018 Winter Olympics in Pyeongchang, South Korea and the 2022 Winter Olympics in Beijing, China.

Early life 
Caroline Claire was born in Edina, Minnesota. Claire has three brothers. She began skiing around the time she learned to walk. She later moved to Manchester Center, Vermont where Claire attends Stratton Mountain School.

Career 
Claire won bronze in slopestyle at the FIS Junior World Championships in both 2015 and 2017. Claire found success on the Revolution Tour in 2016 with podium finishes in each of her appearances on the amateur tour that year. Claire was a discretionary pick to compete for the United States Olympic team in slopestyle for the 2018 Winter Olympics in Pyeongchang.

References 

2000 births
American female freestyle skiers
Living people
Sportspeople from Vermont
Freestyle skiers at the 2018 Winter Olympics
Freestyle skiers at the 2022 Winter Olympics
Olympic freestyle skiers of the United States
21st-century American women